Westrarchaea is a genus of Western Australian shield spiders that was first described by Michael Gordon Rix in 2006.  it contains only three species, found only in Western Australia: W. pusilla, W. sinuosa, and W. spinosa.

See also
 List of Malkaridae species

References

Araneomorphae genera
Malkaridae
Spiders of Australia